Elisabeth Bowers (born October 10, 1949) is a Canadian writer of mystery fiction.

A native of Vancouver, British Columbia, Bowers later moved to the Gulf Islands. She is an alumna of the University of British Columbia, and during her career has held a variety of jobs. She wrote two detective novels, set in Vancouver, featuring Meg Lacey, a full-time detective and divorced mother. The first, Ladies' Night, was a finalist for the Arthur Ellis Award for Best First Novel. Her work has been described as "some of the very best in Canadian crime writing".

Works
Ladies Night (1988)
No Forwarding Address (1991)

References

1949 births
Living people
Canadian women novelists
Canadian mystery writers
University of British Columbia alumni
Women mystery writers
Writers from Vancouver
20th-century Canadian novelists
20th-century Canadian women writers